Anthony Kemp is a British actor. He is known for his role as Nemecsek Ernő in The Boys of Paul Street, which he played when he was fourteen.

Works

Movies 
Cromwell (1970) as Henry Cromwell
London Affair (1970)
Uncle Jonathan (1969) 
The Strange Case (1969) 
Cry Wolf (1968)
The Boys of Paul Street (1968) as Nemecsek Ernő
Oliver!

References 

Living people
British film actors
Year of birth missing (living people)